The Leopaard CS10 is a compact crossover produced by Changfeng Motor of GAC Group under the Leopaard brand.

Overview

The Leopaard CS10 compact crossover originally debuted as the Changfeng Liebao CS10 concept during the 2014 Beijing Auto Show with the production version debuting during the 2015 Shanghai Auto Show  with prices ranging from 89,800 to 146,800 yuan.

The Leopaard CS10 is powered by either a 1.5 liter turbo inline-4 engine producing 150hp or a 2.0 liter turbo inline-4 engine producing 177hp. With the 1.5 liter turbo engine mated to either a 5-speed manual transmission or a continuously variable transmission (CVT) and the 2.0 liter turbo engine mated to a 6-speed dual-clutch transmission (DCT).

The Leopaard CS10 features a front McPherson and the multi-link independent rear suspension.

References

External links

official website

Crossover sport utility vehicles
Front-wheel-drive vehicles
2010s cars
Cars introduced in 2015
Changfeng Motor vehicles